The 8th Kansas Militia Infantry was an infantry regiment that served in the Union Army during the American Civil War.

Service
The 8th Kansas Militia Infantry was called into service on October 9, 1864. It was disbanded on October 29, 1864.

Detailed service
The unit was called into service to defend Kansas against Maj. Gen. Sterling Price's raid.

See also
 List of Kansas Civil War Units

References

Bibliography 
 Dyer, Frederick H. (1959). A Compendium of the War of the Rebellion. New York and London. Thomas Yoseloff, Publisher. .

Units and formations of the Union Army from Kansas
1864 establishments in Kansas
Military units and formations established in 1864
Military units and formations disestablished in 1864